Tribune is an ambiguous – and often misused – architectural term, which can have several meanings. Today, it most often refers to a dais or stage-like platform or, in a vaguer sense, any place from which a speech can be prominently made.

Etymology
The English term tribune ("raised platform") was derived as early as 1762 from French (tribune) and Italian (tribuna) words. These in turn stemmed from Medieval Latin tribuna and from Classical Latin tribunal, the elevated placing of a tribune's (or other Roman magistrate's) seat for official functions in the manner of a throne.

Meanings
 In ancient Rome, the term was used of a semicircular apse in a Roman basilica, with a raised platform, where a presiding magistrate (a tribune, or others) sat in an official chair. Subsequently, it applied generally to any raised structure from which speeches were delivered, including makeshift wooden structures in the Roman Forum and even the private box of the emperor at the Circus Maximus. 
 In Medieval, and later, ecclesiastical architecture, the term applies to an area within a vaulted or semi-domed apse in a room or church. In this sense a tribune may contain a high altar or bishop's seat (cathedra).  These features were particularly common in Roman and Byzantine church architecture. In these Christian basilicas the term is often retained for the semicircular recess behind the choir, as at San Clemente in Rome, Sant'Apollinare in Classe in Ravenna, San Zeno at Verona, or San Miniato near Florence. A secular example is its use for the celebrated octagon room of the Uffizi Palace at Florence.
 The sense of the term is sometimes extended to any gallery, balcony, or triforium. (Nikolaus Pevsner, in his book series The Buildings of England (1951–74), is at pains to point out that a tribune and a triforium, while often confused, are not the same thing.) In a church, it may refer to an open arcade overlooking the nave of a church – or indeed any large hall – often situated below a clerestory. 
 The term is also loosely applied to various other raised spaces in secular or ecclesiastical buildings – in the latter sometimes in the place of pulpit, as in the Priory of Saint-Martin-des-Champs at Paris.  Thus,"tribune" can refer to a dais or stage-like platform,  or in a vaguer sense any place in a building from which a speech can be prominently made, which seems a return to the original function of the early Roman tribunal. This is the origin of the common metaphorical use of "tribune" in the names of newspapers, magazines and broadcast news programs.

Notes

References

Architectural elements